Edmund Wyatt Gordon (born June 13, 1921) is a professor of psychology who "had a tremendous influence on contemporary thinking in psychology, education and social policy and the implications of his work for the schooling of lower status youth and children of color in America".

Professor Gordon's career spans professional practice, minister, clinical and counseling psychologist, research scientist, author, editor, and professor. Gordon was recognized as a preeminent scholar of African-American studies when he was awarded the 2011 Dr. John Hope Franklin Award from Diverse Issues in Higher Education magazine at the 93rd Annual Meeting of the American Council on Education.

He cites as major influencers Herbert G. Birch, W. E. B. Du Bois, and Alain LeRoy Locke.

Background
Gordon's scholarship has focused on the development of students who were African-American, ethnic minorities, and of low socioeconomic status who triumphed over significant odds to become better achievers. He is widely known for his research on diverse human characteristics and pedagogy. His research includes the advancement of the concepts of "the Achievement Gap", "Affirmative development of academic ability", and "Supplementary Education", all which focus on improving the quality of academic achievement in diverse learners. His publications consist of more than 200 articles and 18 books and monographs.

In a New York Times article about Gordon's personal life and professional contributions, Gordon cites Alain LeRoy Locke, Herbert G. Birch, and W. E. B. Du Bois as the mentors that influenced him throughout his studies.  Gordon was struggling to succeed at Howard University when Locke helped to encourage him and keep him on track.  Gordon has stated that Locke set him on the course of serious scholarship.  Next, he discussed his interaction with Birch, a research psychologist at City College.  Birch encouraged Gordon to go to the library and read.  Finally, Gordon describes his mentorship with W. E. B. Du Bois, a world-renowned author, activist, and co-founder of the NAACP.  Du Bois suggested that Gordon study the percentage of minority students that succeed despite serious challenges.

Professional life
Edmund Gordon was working at Stanford University with colleagues that were involved in John F. Kennedy's beginnings of social change.  Soon after, Kennedy was assassinated and Lyndon Johnson became president.  Gordon was given the job of evaluating the Head Start program.  Gordon stated that getting this job had as much to do with his doctoral studies as it did affirmative action. Gordon has stated that while he believes Head Start has been a success from a government standpoint, the program could have been much more than it is today.  His colleagues and he viewed the project as not only a child development project, but also a project to influence and improve the lives of families and communities.  The latter part of Gordon's dreams for Head Start have not come to be, but he still believes the overall program has been a success.

Gordon received his bachelor's degree in Zoology and Social Ethics in Divinity from Howard University, a Master of Arts degree in Social Psychology from American University, and the Doctor of Education degree in child development and guidance from Teachers College, Columbia University. He was also awarded the Masters of Arts degree (honorary) from Yale University and the Doctor of Humane Letters degree (honorary) from Yeshiva University and Brown University.

From July 2000 until August 2001 he was Vice President of Academic Affairs and Interim Dean at Teachers College, Columbia University. He is the John M. Musser Professor of Psychology Emeritus at Yale University, the Richard March Hoe Professor at Teachers College, Columbia University, and founding director of the Institute for Urban and Minority Education and the Institute for Research on African Diaspora in the Americas and Caribbean (IRADAC) at The City College of New York. In 2006, Dr. Gordon was appointed Senior Scholar in Residence at SUNY Rockland Community College, an appointment that was renewed in 2010. In 2003, Educational Testing Service endowed a chair in Dr. Gordon's honor.

Gordon was elected member of the National Academy of Education in 1968. In 2005, Columbia University named its campus in Harlem, NY the Edmund W. Gordon Campus of Teachers College, Columbia University.

On June 28, 2010, he was awarded the 2010 American Educational Research Association (AERA) "Relating Research to Practice Award."

The professor served as chairperson of the Gordon Commission with Educational Testing Service from 2011 through the publication of its reports in 2013.

On December 15, 2014, The Board of Regents of the University of Texas System approved the honorific naming of the newly renovated and expanded Geography Building as the Susan G. and Edmund W. Gordon & Charles W. and Frances B. White Building, now referred to as the Gordon-White Building.

In 2017, he was elected a Fellow of the American Academy of Arts and Sciences.

In 2019, Gordon hosted the Human Variance and Assessment for Learning: Implications for Diverse Learners of STEM national conference at Teachers College, Columbia University, convening scholars, policymakers, school principals, and students together to discuss selected models of measurement for the implementation of new ways of generating and utilizing data from assessments.

Archives have been established to catalogue Gordon's publishing and community engagement at the Schomburg Center for Research in Black Culture in 1990 and at the University of Texas at Austin in 2018.

In April 2021 Gordon was named Honorary President of the American Educational Research Association (AERA), the first person to receive this recognition in the organization's history.

Personal life
Edmund Gordon was born in 1921 in the segregated town of Goldsboro, North Carolina.  His father emigrated from Jamaica and began to practice medicine when he married Gordon's mother, an elementary school teacher.  While the town was heavily segregated and African Americans weren't allowed to shop alongside white Americans, the Gordon family was allowed to shop in a department store on Wednesday afternoons because of the strong reputation of Gordon's father.

He was married to Dr. Susan Gitt Gordon, a pediatrician for over 60 years.  Together they had four children, nine grandchildren (including Jessica Gordon Nembhard) and seven great-grandchildren. In 2000, they co-founded The CEJJES Institute in Pomona, New York on route NY 45 in Rockland County, New York to serve the African Diaspora.

He turned 100 in 2021.

References

External links 
Edmund W. Gordon papers, 1957-1990 Schomburg Center for Research in Black Culture, The New York Public Library.
Edmund W. Gordon papers Benson Latin American Collection, UT Austin.

1921 births
Living people
American University alumni
Teachers College, Columbia University alumni
Columbia University faculty
Rockland Community College faculty
Yale University faculty
People from Goldsboro, North Carolina
African-American centenarians
American centenarians
Men centenarians